Camp Sherman is an unincorporated community and census-designated place (CDP) in Jefferson County, Oregon, United States. It is located on the Metolius River. The year-round population as of the 2010 census was 233, with that number tripling or more during the summer. The community includes an elementary school, Black Butte School, a general store and a post office (ZIP code 97730). The community also has a volunteer fire department. Camp Sherman was founded by vacationers from Sherman County in the latter part of the 19th century.

Demographics

Notable features 
In 1949, Luther Metke was a key builder of the Camp Sherman Community Hall, the center of social activity in the community. In February 2003 it was listed as a National Register of Historic Places due to its rustic architecture highlighting late 19th & early 20th century American movements: Bungalow/Craftsman and Western Stick architecture.

Climate
This region experiences warm (but not hot) and dry summers, with no average monthly temperatures above 71.6 °F.  According to the Köppen Climate Classification system, Camp Sherman has a warm-summer Mediterranean climate, abbreviated "Csb" on climate maps.

References

External links

Unincorporated communities in Jefferson County, Oregon
Census-designated places in Oregon
Census-designated places in Jefferson County, Oregon
Unincorporated communities in Oregon